There are 39 species of reptiles whose ranges include at least parts of the state of West Virginia, USA.  With 20 species of snakes, 13 turtle species, and 6 lizard species, the state's reptile diversity is high.  However, many of these species are declining in population due to habitat destruction, water pollution, and the killing of reptiles out of ignorant fear.

The taxa
The following letters indicate the likelihood of finding each animal in West Virginia:

In addition, the IUCN classifies two of these species as endangered , one as vulnerable , and one as near-threatened .

Order Testudines (turtles)
Family Chelydridae (snapping turtles)
 Common snapping turtle (Chelydra s. serpentina) C

Family Emydidae (pond turtles)
 Spotted turtle (Clemmys guttata) R, 
 Wood turtle (Glyptemys insculpta) U, 
 Eastern box turtle (Terrapene c. carolina) C, 
 Northern map turtle (Graptemys geographica) U
 Ouachita map turtle (Graptemys o. ouachitensis) R
 Eastern painted turtle (Chrysemys p. picta) C
 Midland painted turtle (Chrysemys picta marginata) C
 Red-eared slider (Trachemys scripta elegans) C
 Eastern river cooter (Pseudemys c. concinna) U
 Northern red-bellied cooter (Pseudemys rubriventris) U, 

Family Kinosternidae (mud turtles and musk turtles)
 Common musk turtle (Sternotherus odoratus) C

Family Trionychidae (softshells)
 Northern spiny softshell turtle (Apalone s. spinifera) C
 Smooth softshell turtle (Apalone m. mutica) R

Order Squamata (scaled reptiles)
Family Phrynosomatidae (spiny lizards)
 Eastern fence lizard (Sceloporus undulatus) C

Family Teiidae (whiptails)
 Eastern six-lined racerunner (Aspidoscelis s. sexlineata) U

Family Scincidae (skinks)
 Little brown skink (Scincella lateralis) U
 Five-lined skink (Plestiodon fasciatus) C
 Broad-headed skink (Plestiodon laticeps) U
 Northern coal skink (Plestiodon a. anthracinus) U

Family Colubridae (colubrid snakes)
 Queen snake (Regina septemvittata) C
 Northern water snake (Nerodia s. sipedon) C
 Northern brown snake (Storeria d. dekayi) U
 Northern redbelly snake (Storeria o. occipitomaculata) C
 Eastern ribbon snake (Thamnophis s. sauritus) U
 Eastern garter snake (Thamnophis s. sirtalis) C
 Smooth earth snake (Virginia valeriae) U
 Eastern hog-nosed snake (Heterodon platirhinos) U
 Eastern worm snake (Carphophis a. amoenus) C
 Northern ringneck snake (Diadophis punctatus edwardsii) C
 Northern black racer (Coluber c. constrictor) C
 Northern rough green snake (Opheodrys a. aestivus) U
 Smooth green snake (Opheodrys vernalis) C
 Corn snake (Pantherophis guttatus) R
 Eastern ratsnake (Pantherophis alleghaniensis) C
 Northern pine snake (Pituophis m. melanoleucus) R
 Eastern kingsnake (Lampropeltis g. getula) R
 Black kingsnake (Lampropeltis nigra) C
 Eastern milk snake (Lampropeltis t. triangulum) C

Family Viperidae (vipers)
 Northern copperhead (Agkistrodon contortrix mokasen) C
 Timber rattlesnake (Crotalus horridus) C

See also
 Lists of reptiles by region
West Virginia State Wildlife Center, a small zoo featuring native West Virginia animals
Fauna of West Virginia
List of West Virginia wildlife management areas

References

Reptiles
West Virginia